The 2020–21 UEFA Europa League was the 50th season of Europe's secondary club football tournament organised by UEFA, and the 12th season since it was renamed from the UEFA Cup to the UEFA Europa League.

Villarreal defeated Manchester United in the final, played at the Stadion Miejski in Gdańsk, Poland, 11–10 on penalties following a 1–1 draw after extra time, winning the competition for the first time in club history. Villarreal thus automatically qualified for the 2021–22 UEFA Champions League group stage and earned the right to play in the 2021 UEFA Super Cup. The stadium was originally appointed to host the 2020 UEFA Europa League Final, but this was moved due to the COVID-19 pandemic in Europe in 2020.

As the title holders of the Europa League, Sevilla qualified for the 2020–21 UEFA Champions League, although they had already qualified before the final through their league performance. They were unable to defend their title as they advanced to the Champions League knockout stage, and were eliminated by Borussia Dortmund in the round of 16.

Association team allocation
A total of 213 teams from all 55 UEFA member associations participated in the 2020–21 UEFA Europa League. The association ranking based on the UEFA country coefficients was used to determine the number of participating teams for each association:
Associations 1–50 (except Liechtenstein) each had three teams qualify.
Associations 51–55 each had two teams qualify (starting from this season, with association 51 losing one spot and association 55 gaining one spot).
Liechtenstein had one team qualify (Liechtenstein organised only a domestic cup and no domestic league).
Moreover, 55 teams eliminated from the 2020–21 UEFA Champions League were transferred to the Europa League (default number was 57, but two fewer teams competed in the 2020–21 UEFA Champions League).

Association ranking
For the 2020–21 UEFA Europa League, the associations were allocated places according to their 2019 UEFA country coefficients, which took into account their performance in European competitions from 2014–15 to 2018–19.

Apart from the allocation based on the country coefficients, associations could have additional teams participating in the Champions League, as noted below:
 – Additional teams transferred from the UEFA Champions League

Distribution
The following was the access list for this season.

Changes were made to the default access list since the Champions League title holders, Bayern Munich, and the Europa League title holders, Sevilla, which were guaranteed berths in the Champions League group stage, already qualified for the Champions League group stage via their domestic leagues, meaning there were fewer teams transferred from the Champions League due to changes in the Champions League access list. However, as a result of schedule delays to both the 2019–20 and 2020–21 European seasons due to the COVID-19 pandemic, the 2020–21 European season started before the conclusion of the 2019–20 European season. Therefore, the changes to the access list that should have been made based on the Champions League and Europa League title holders could not be certain until matches of the earlier qualifying rounds had been played and/or their draws had been made. UEFA used "adaptive re-balancing" to change the access list once the berths for the Champions League and Europa League title holders were determined, and rounds which had already been drawn or played by the time the title holders were determined would not be impacted (Regulations Article 3.07) The following changes were made:
Since the Champions League title holder berth in the 2020–21 UEFA Champions League group stage was vacated, only five losers of the Champions League third qualifying round (Champions Path), instead of the original six, were transferred to the Europa League play-off round (Champions Path). In this case, two losers of Champions League second qualifying round (Champions Path), determined by draw, received a bye to the play-off round (Champions Path) instead of entering the third qualifying round (Champions Path).
At the time when the draws for the preliminary round and first qualifying round were held on 9 and 10 August 2020, it was not certain whether the Europa League title holder berth in the 2020–21 UEFA Champions League group stage would be vacated as four of the quarter-finalists of the 2019–20 UEFA Europa League, Wolverhampton Wanderers, Bayer Leverkusen, Copenhagen and Basel, did not qualify for the 2020–21 UEFA Champions League group stage via their domestic leagues. Therefore, these draws proceeded as normal per the default access list, and the matches drawn, which were played on 18–21 and 25–27 August 2020, were not changed even though after the quarter-finals of the 2019–20 UEFA Europa League, which were played on 10–11 August 2020, it was confirmed all four semi-finalists, Sevilla, Manchester United, Inter Milan and Shakhtar Donetsk, already qualified for the 2020–21 UEFA Champions League group stage via their domestic leagues, meaning the Europa League title holder berth would be vacated. As a result, only three losers of the Champions League third qualifying round (League Path), instead of the original four, were transferred to the Europa League group stage, and "adaptive re-balancing" started from the second qualifying round (Main Path), whose draw was held on 31 August 2020, and the following changes to the access list were made:
The cup winners of association 13 (Czech Republic), entered the group stage instead of the third qualifying round (Main Path).
The cup winners of associations 18 (Cyprus) and 19 (Serbia), entered the third qualifying round (Main Path) instead of the second qualifying round (Main Path).

Redistribution rules
A Europa League place was vacated when a team qualified for both the Champions League and the Europa League, or qualified for the Europa League by more than one method. When a place was vacated, it was redistributed within the national association by the following rules:
When the domestic cup winners (considered as the "highest-placed" qualifier within the national association with the latest starting round) also qualified for the Champions League, their Europa League place was vacated. As a result, the highest-placed team in the league which had not yet qualified for European competitions qualified for the Europa League, with the Europa League qualifiers which finished above them in the league moved up one "place".
When the domestic cup winners also qualified for the Europa League through league position, their place through the league position was vacated. As a result, the highest-placed team in the league which had not yet qualified for European competitions qualified for the Europa League, with the Europa League qualifiers which finished above them in the league moved up one "place" if possible.
For associations where a Europa League place was reserved for either the League Cup or end-of-season European competition play-offs winners, they always qualified for the Europa League as the "lowest-placed" qualifier. If the League Cup winners had already qualified for European competitions through other methods, this reserved Europa League place was taken by the highest-placed team in the league which had not yet qualified for European competitions.

Teams
In early April 2020, UEFA announced that due to the COVID-19 pandemic in Europe, the deadline for entering the tournament had been postponed until further notice. UEFA also sent a letter to all member associations that domestic leagues must be completed in full without ending prematurely in order to qualify for European competitions. After meeting with the 55 UEFA associations on 21 April 2020, UEFA strongly recommended them to finish domestic top league and cup competitions, although in some special cases where it was not possible, UEFA developed guidelines concerning participation in its club competitions in case of a cancelled league or cup. After the UEFA Executive Committee meeting on 23 April 2020, UEFA announced that if a domestic competition was prematurely terminated for legitimate reasons in accordance with conditions related to public health or economic problems, the national associations concerned were required to select their participating teams for the 2020–21 UEFA club competitions based on sporting merit in the 2019–20 domestic competitions, and UEFA reserved the right to refuse their admission if UEFA deemed the termination of the competitions not legitimate, or the selection procedure not objective, transparent and non-discriminatory, or the team was perceived by the public as qualifying unfairly. A suspended domestic competition could also be restarted with a different format from the original one in a manner which would still facilitate qualification on sporting merit. All leagues were initially to communicate to UEFA by 25 May 2020 whether they intended to restart their competitions, but this deadline was later extended. On 17 June 2020, UEFA announced that associations had to enter their teams by 3 August 2020. If a cup was abandoned or not completed by the UEFA registration deadline, the Europa League places were distributed by league positions only.

The labels in the parentheses show how each team qualified for the place of its starting round:
CW: Cup winners
2nd, 3rd, 4th, 5th, 6th, etc.: League position of the previous season
LC: League Cup winners
RW: Regular season winners
PW: End-of-season Europa League play-offs winners
UCL: Transferred from the Champions League
GS: Third-placed teams from the group stage
CH/LP PO: Losers from the play-off round (Champions/League Path)
CH/LP Q3: Losers from the third qualifying round (Champions/League Path)
CH/LP Q2: Losers from the second qualifying round (Champions/League Path)
Q1: Losers from the first qualifying round
PR: Losers from the preliminary round (F: final; SF: semi-finals)
Abd-: League positions of abandoned season due to the COVID-19 pandemic in Europe as determined by the national association; all teams were subject to approval by UEFA as per the guidelines for entry to European competitions in response to the COVID-19 pandemic

The second qualifying round, third qualifying round and play-off round were divided into Champions Path (CH) and Main Path (MP).

Notes

Schedule
The schedule of the competition was as follows (all draws were held at the UEFA headquarters in Nyon, Switzerland). The tournament would originally have started in June 2020, but was delayed to August due to the COVID-19 pandemic in Europe. The new schedule was announced by the UEFA Executive Committee on 17 June 2020. All qualifying matches, including the play-off round, were played as single leg matches, hosted by one of the teams decided by draw.

The group stage draw was originally to be held at the Stavros Niarchos Foundation Cultural Center in Athens, Greece, but UEFA announced on 9 September 2020 that it would be relocated to Nyon.

Note: Matches could also be played on Tuesdays or Wednesdays instead of the regular Thursdays due to scheduling conflicts.

The original schedule of the competition, as planned before the pandemic, was as follows (all draws were to be held at the UEFA headquarters in Nyon, Switzerland, unless stated otherwise).

Effects of the COVID-19 pandemic
Due to the COVID-19 pandemic in Europe, the following special rules were applicable to the competition:
If there were travel restrictions related to the COVID-19 pandemic that prevented the away team from entering the home team's country or returning to their own country, the match could be played at a neutral country or the away team's country that allowed the match to take place.
If a team refused to play or was considered responsible for a match not taking place, they were considered to have forfeited the match. If both teams refused to play or were considered responsible for a match not taking place, both teams were disqualified.
If a team had players and/or officials tested positive for SARS-2 coronavirus preventing them from playing the match before the deadline set by UEFA, they were considered to have forfeited the match.

On 24 September 2020, UEFA announced that five substitutions would be permitted from the group stage onward, with a sixth allowed in extra time. However, each team was only given three opportunities to make substitutions during matches, with a fourth opportunity in extra time, excluding substitutions made at half-time, before the start of extra time and at half-time in extra time. Consequently, a maximum of twelve players could be listed on the substitute bench.

All qualifying matches were played behind closed doors. Following the partial return of fans at the 2020 UEFA Super Cup, UEFA announced on 1 October 2020 that matches from the group stage onward could be played at 30% capacity if allowed by the local authorities. Video assistant referees were not introduced for the group stage as planned (now to start in 2021–22), but were still used in the knockout phase.

Qualifying rounds

Preliminary round

First qualifying round

Second qualifying round

Third qualifying round

Play-off round

Group stage

A total of 48 teams played in the group phase: 18 teams which entered in this phase, the 21 winners of the play-off round (eight from Champions Path, thirteen from Main Path), the six losers of the 2020–21 UEFA Champions League play-off round (four from Champions Path, two from League Path), and the three League Path losers of the 2020–21 UEFA Champions League third qualifying round.

The draw for the group phase was held on 2 October 2020, 13:00 CEST. The 48 teams were drawn into twelve groups of four, with the restriction that teams from the same association could not be drawn against each other. For the draw, the teams were seeded into four pots based on their 2020 UEFA club coefficients.

In each group, teams played against each other home-and-away in a round-robin format. The group winners and runners-up advanced to the round of 32, where they were joined by the eight third-placed teams of the 2020–21 UEFA Champions League group phase.

Antwerp, Granada, Leicester City, Omonia and Sivasspor made their debut appearances in the group stage. Furthermore, Granada qualified for any European competition for the first time in the club's history.

Group A

Group B

Group C

Group D

Group E

Group F

Group G

Group H

Group I

Group J

Group K

Group L

Knockout phase

In the knockout phase, teams played against each other over two legs on a home-and-away basis, except for the one-match final.

Bracket

Round of 32

Round of 16

Quarter-finals

Semi-finals

Final

Statistics
Statistics exclude qualifying rounds and play-off round.

Top goalscorers

Top assists

Squad of the season
The UEFA technical study group selected the following 23 players as the squad of the tournament.

Player of the season
Votes were cast by coaches of the 48 teams in the group stage, together with 55 journalists selected by the European Sports Media (ESM) group, representing each of UEFA's member associations. The coaches were not allowed to vote for players from their own teams. Jury members selected their top three players, with the first receiving five points, the second three and the third one. The shortlist of the top three players was announced on 13 August 2021. The award winner was announced during the 2021–22 UEFA Europa League group stage draw in Turkey on 27 August 2021.

See also
2020–21 UEFA Champions League
2021 UEFA Super Cup

Notes

References

External links

Fixtures and Results, 2020–21, UEFA.com

 
2
2020-21
Association football events postponed due to the COVID-19 pandemic